Neoblastobasis eurotella is a moth in the family Blastobasidae. It is found in the United Arab Emirates and Pakistan.

References

Moths described in 2010
Blastobasidae